The Leadville Historic District is in the mining town of Leadville, Colorado. The National Historic Landmark District includes 67 mines in the mining district east of the city up to the 12,000 foot (3658 m) level, and a defined portion of the village area. It was designated in 1961.  Then, when the National Register of Historic Places (NRHP) program was started in 1966, Leadville's National Historic District was included in its first day's listings, along with all other existing National Historic Landmarks.  The NRHP district was later expanded, adding a number of structures along the Harrison Avenue corridor, and making them eligible for historic preservation grants and tax subsidies, too.

Buildings

Principal historic buildings in the district are:  Tabor Grand Hotel, St. George's Church, Temple Israel, Annunciation Church, Tabor Opera House, City Hall, Healy House, Dexter Cabin, Engelbach House, and Tabor House, as well as mining structures and homes of miners, merchants, and businesspeople.  Structures built after 1917 are considered non-contributing.

Boot Hill Cemetery

Leadville was the site of a Boot Hill Cemetery, which is perhaps the "most documented" of those in the Old West.

According to an eyewitness:

"At the foot of Chestnut street, a little distance from the Leadville Smeltering Company's works, in an acre plot of ground unfenced, and with the carbonate-like earth thrown up into little heaps. On a closer inspection, the stranger will see that many of these carbonate mounds are marked by pieces of boards, slabs and sticks. Two or three have marble slabs and as many more are marked by pine [wood] boards painted in imitation of marble. ... [It was a] barren red clay-colored plot [with] no flowery lawns, spouting fountains, shady nooks, grassy plats, nor artistically carved marble. ... A worse or less inviting spot for the repose of the dead could not have been found within the environs of our city. Here all the vast transportation of a great mining camp passes in daily bustle and confusionis, and the sleep of our dead forever disturbed by the oaths and the black snake of the irreverent freighter [train]."

Historic structures in Leadville

The National Register of Historic Places is the official list of the Nation's historic places worthy of preservation. Authorized by the National Historic Preservation Act of 1966, the National Park Service's National Register of Historic Places is part of a national program to coordinate and support public and private efforts to identify, evaluate, and protect America's historic and archeological resources.

See also
National Register of Historic Places listings in Lake County, Colorado

References

External links

National Historic Landmarks in Colorado
National Historic Landmark Districts
Buildings and structures in Lake County, Colorado
Geography of Lake County, Colorado
Boot Hill cemeteries
Historic districts on the National Register of Historic Places in Colorado
National Register of Historic Places in Lake County, Colorado